Phytelephas olsonii is a species of fossil palm in the genus Phytelephas.

References

olsonii